All That Is Bitter Is Sweet (Traditional Chinese: 大藥坊; literally "The Great Apothecary") is a 2014 Hong Kong period, medical, romance drama produced by TVB, starring Linda Chung, Ruco Chan and Raymond Wong Ho-yin as the main leads, with Natalie Tong, Pierre Ngo, Sammy Sum and Elliot Ngok as the major supporting roles. Filming took place from November 2013 to February 2014. The drama began broadcasting on September 8, 2014 on TVB Jade channel during its 8:30 - 9:30 p.m. timeslot, and will finish airing on October 17, 2014 with 30 episodes total.

Synopsis
Set during the Republic of China, when each region of China was ruled by local warlords. The Dou family of Foshan is an affluent family that owns and runs Sheung Chun Tong, the largest traditional Chinese apothecary in town. Bad times, however, came during an epidemic. When the apothecary's product caused the death of the Mayor's eldest son (and owner Dou Sam's soon-to-be son in law), Dou Sam is imprisoned, and the apothecary was ordered closed. Sam's only daughter, Dou Gaai Kei, then took on the task of investigating her fiancé's death, in hopes of releasing her father. Together with Ding Yat Yuen, a businessman of dubious reputation, they stumble upon a big conspiracy that could rock Chinese politics.

Cast

Main cast
Linda Chung 鍾嘉欣 as Dou Gaai Kei 杜佳期 
Ruco Chan 陳展鵬 as Ting Yat Yuen 丁一元
Raymond Wong Ho-yin 黃浩然 as  Chong Kei Cho 莊繼祖 / Chong Kei Chung 莊繼宗
Natalie Tong 唐詩詠 as Hui Kwan Yeuk 許君約

Supporting cast

Dou family
Yan Pak 白茵 as Ling Fung Yee 凌鳳兒
Du Yan Ge 杜燕歌 as Dou Sam 杜蔘
Shirley Yeung 楊思琦 as Fung Yuk Kam 馮玉琴
Pierre Ngo 敖嘉年 as Dou Yung 杜茸

Chong family
Pat Poon 潘志文 as Chong Deoi Yu 莊敦儒
Susan Tse 謝雪心 as Wai Chau Hing 衛秋卿
Elliot Ngok 岳華 as Hui Sung Ming 許崇明
Kitty Lau 劉桂芳 as Ha Jie 霞姐
Kate Tsang 曾琬莎 as Siu Ting 小婷
Lydia Law 羅欣羚 as Ha Yuk 夏玉

Foshan Police
Sammy Sum 沈震軒 as Ngai Chun 魏俊
Dickson Li 李家聲 as Man Keung 文強
Kong Wing Fai 江榮暉 as Mo Kit 武傑

Ding Yat Yuen's gang
Jazz Lam 林子善 as Hung Bing 洪炳
Willie Wai 韋家雄 as Wong Fu Sau 皇甫壽
Brian Tse 謝東閔 as Kam Fuk 金福

Shun Chun Tong
Yu Chi Ming 余子明 as Chong Suk 昌叔
Owen Cheung 張振朗 as Gai Gei Jai 枸杞仔
Moses Cheng 鄭詠謙 as Ah Fu 阿富
Aaryn Cheung 張明偉 as Ah Hoi 阿海
Chan Wing Chun 陳榮峻 as Physician Cheng 鄭大夫
Lee Hoi San 李海生 as Yeung Bak 楊伯
Samantha Ko 高海寧 as Pin Pin 翩翩 killed by Ngai Chun episode 26
Rainbow Ching 程可為 as Hung Yut Ho 洪月好
Jimmy Au 歐瑞偉 as Wong Jing Wing 王正永
Man Yeung 楊證樺 as Secretary Yuen 阮秘書
Siu Koi Yan 蕭凱欣 as Cun Fa 春花
Christy Chan 陳潔玲 as Cau Yut 秋月
Akai Lee 李啟傑 as Wong Tat 王達
Louis Szeto 司徒暉 as Ah Fa 阿輝
Raymond Tsang 曾守明 as Guk's father 菊父
Esther Wan 溫裕紅 as Guk's mother 菊母

Development
The Sale Presentation clip was filmed in October 2013. The 1 minute 2 second clip previewed in November 2013 features all the main actors that are confirmed for the drama.
On November 1, 2013 the drama costume fitting ceremony was held at 12:30 p.m. Tseung Kwan O TVB City Studio One.
The blessing ceremony took place on November 20, 2014 12:00 p.m. at Tseung Kwan O TVB City.
On March 25, 2014, a trailer of the drama was previewed at FILMART 2014.

Viewership ratings

References

External links
Official Website

TVB dramas
Hong Kong television series
Television series set in the 20th century
2014 Hong Kong television series debuts
2014 Hong Kong television series endings
2010s Hong Kong television series
Television shows set in Guangdong